DWJP (103.5 FM), broadcasting as 103.5 Aguila News FM, is a radio station owned by Amapola Broadcasting System and operated by Rapido Media Production of Jayroll Baile. The station's studio and transmitter are located at Purok 2, Brgy. Quirangay, Camalig.

The station was formerly under Bombo Radyo Philippines through its now-defunct licensee Consolidated Broadcasting System. It was known as Star FM from its inception on March 1, 1998, to January 30, 2006, when it went off the air. Back then, it was located in Legazpi, Albay.

References

Radio stations established in 1998
Radio stations established in 2020
Radio stations in Albay